Maui and Sons, Inc. (abbreviated Maui & Sons) is an American surf and skateboard apparel company which specializes in surfwear and skater clothing products.The clothing, equipment and others products are designed for snowboarders, skateboarders and surfers.

The company also produces a line of apparel for women and children under the licenses "Maui Girl", "Maui Kids", and "Maui Princess".

History
Maui and Sons was established by three surfers from Malibu, California in 1980.  Having previously tried various businesses that failed (including a cookie company), the group decided to create a surf apparel brand, and named it "Maui & Sons." The company's namesake is the Hawaiian island of Maui.

In 1989, Maui & Sons was sold to Richard Harrington.

Years later, an agreement would be reached between Cherokee and Maui & Sons, to expand sales of the brand into most parts of the United States and Canada.

The company logo is based on the old cookie company's business logo, "Maui's Chocolate Chip."

References

Companies based in Hawaii
Surfwear brands
Clothing retailers of the United States
1980 establishments in Hawaii
Companies established in 1980